Carrington Street is a street in the south-eastern sector of the centre of Adelaide, South Australia. It runs east–west, from East Terrace to King William Street, blocked at Hutt Street and crossing Pulteney Street at Hurtle Square.

History
Carrington Street was named by the Street Naming Committee on 23 May 1837 after John Abel Smith (Lord Carrington), a member of the National Colonisation Society of 1830.

A girls' school was founded and operated by Elizabeth Whitby from 1848. In 1851 the school was receiving government grants for 4 boys and 22 girls, and on the day of inspection she had 27 girls under instruction.

On 11 July 1852, a Swedenborgian church, also known as the New Church, opened on Carrington Street. Organist G. T. Light played at its first service. Jacob Pitman served as minister until 1859.

The Church of England's Orphan Home for Girls was established on Carrington Street in 1860 in a former German hospital, opening in October 1861. It was founded by Julia Farr, Mrs W. S. Douglas, Mrs Kent Hughes, and one other. H. Kent Hughes (c.1814–1880), was treasurer for some years.  The orphanage moved to Fullarton Road, Mitcham  in August 1909, after the management of the home bought the residence of T. O'Halloran Giles (son of pastoralist Thomas Giles). 

The King's Theatre was at 318 King William Street, designed by Williams & Good. It was located on the north-east corner of King William and Carrington Streets, with main entrances on both streets. It opened in February 1911. It closed in 1928, when it was remodelled into the King's Ballroom, with  its entrance in Carrington Street. After closure in 1975 due to a serious fire, the building remained vacant for several years. It was transformed into legal offices in the 1980s.

Junction list

See also

References

Streets in Adelaide
1837 establishments in Australia